Ormesson-sur-Marne (literally Ormesson on Marne) is a commune in the southeastern suburbs of Paris, France.

Transport
Ormesson-sur-Marne is served by no station of the Paris Métro, RER, or suburban rail network. The closest stations to Ormesson-sur-Marne are two stations on Paris RER line A: Sucy – Bonneuil and La Varenne – Chennevières. The former is located in the neighboring commune of Sucy-en-Brie,  from the town center of Ormesson-sur-Marne, and the latter is located in the neighboring commune of Saint-Maur-des-Fossés,  from the town center of Ormesson-sur-Marne.

Population

Education
Schools in the commune include:
Preschools/nurseries: Ecole maternelle Anatole France, Ecole maternelle André le Nôtre, Ecole maternelle Jean de La Fontaine
Elementary schools: Ecole élémentaire Anatole France, Ecole élémentaire André le Nôtre, Ecole élémentaire Jules Ferry
Junior high school: Collège Antoine de Saint-Exupéry

High school/sixth-form students attend Lycée Samuel de Champlain in Chennevières-sur-Marne.

Twinnings
As of July 2016, Ormesson-sur-Marne is twinned with Northallerton in North Yorkshire.

See also
Communes of the Val-de-Marne department

References

External links

 Home page

Links
Play at the Tennis Ormesson sur Marne

Communes of Val-de-Marne